Darwin's Waiting Room was an American alternative metal band from Miami, Florida, United States.

History
Darwin's Waiting Room formed in 1995 and went through several lineup changes before solidifying early in 2000. They signed to MCA Records and released their debut album, Orphan, in 2001. The album peaked at No. 19 on the Billboard Heatseekers chart that year. Following the album's success, they scored airplay with the single "Feel So Stupid (Table 9)" on MTV2, MTVX and Much Music, and toured with Godsmack, Deftones, Nonpoint, and Machine Head. A sophomore effort, Apology Accepted, followed in 2003, but was never officially released.

In 2004, guitarist Eddie "The Kydd" Rendini made an online statement to Digital Noise, saying:

I think it is time to let everyone know what exactly is going on with DWR. DWR is officially broken up. We all decided to follow new musical endeavors after a very long and complicated legal battle. So i just wanted to take the time to thank all of our fans for sticking with us, and support us in our new musical endeavors. As for the "Apology Accepted" album, it is currently done and we will try to put that out for all you DWR fans, as our last offering for a while. Thanks for your support... and remember it's never the end... but just always new beginnings! -Edward

After the band's break-up, both Jabe and Joe started a new band called 75 Winters. They have since disbanded as well. As well around this time, Rendini joined the Jacksonville, FL band Cold, only to leave later that year.

In 2005, bassist Alex Cando joined the Louisville, KY band Five Bolt Main, featuring former Flaw vocalist Chris Volz. The band called it quits in late 2006 when Flaw made the decision to reunite. Cando then joined Flaw for their reunion tour, only to part ways with them in mid-2007. He is now playing bass for the Illinois band Finding Ghosts and working with Morgan Rose of Sevendust.

In 2009, Grimm began recording a new music project with South Florida producer Ozny, of New Era and has posted a new song from his upcoming album on his Myspace entitled "W2MC (Sunny Weather, Shady People)".

On January 30, 2015, former band member Eddie Rendini died.

Members
Final lineup
Jabe - vocals (1995-2004)
Michael "Grimm" Falk - vocals, rapping (1995-2004)
Eddie "The Kydd" Rendini - lead guitar (1996-2004, died 2015)
Alex Cando - bass guitar (1996-2004)
Joe "Johnny 5" Perrone - drums (1997-2004)

Former members
John Carpenter - drums (1996-1997)
David Broder - rhythm guitar (1999-2000)
Seneca "Sensquatch" Konturas - lead guitar, backing vocals (1996)
Seth "≤16" Horan - bass guitar, backing vocals (1996)

Discography
Darwin's Waiting Room (1996)
Orphan (2001)
Apology Accepted (Leaked onto internet) (2003)

References
Footnotes

Further reading
"Room to Rock". Miami Herald, August 10, 2001.
"Darwin's Waiting Room Evolving Into Higher Species". Worcester Telegram Gazette, February 7, 2002.

Musical groups from Miami
Musical groups established in 1995
Musical groups disestablished in 2004
American alternative metal musical groups
Rap metal musical groups
American nu metal musical groups
Alternative rock groups from Florida